Jean-Paul Delahaye (born 29 June 1952 in Saint-Mandé Seine) is a French computer scientist and mathematician.

Career
Delahaye has been a professor of computer science at the Lille University of Science and Technology since 1988 and a researcher in the school's computer sciences lab since 1983. Since 1991 he has written a monthly column in Pour la Science, the French version of Scientific American, dealing with mathematical games and recreations, logic, and computer science.   He is a contributing author of the online scientific journal Interstices and a science and mathematics advisor to the Encyclopædia Britannica.

Delahaye won the 1998 d'Alembert prize from the Société mathématique de France for his books and articles popularizing mathematics, especially for the book Le fascinant nombre Pi.

Works
 
 Formal Methods in Artificial Intelligence, North-Oxford Academic, 1987, 
 Le fascinant nombre pi, Paris: Bibliothèque Pour la Science, 1997,

References

External links

Jean-Paul Delahaye at the Mathematics Genealogy Project
Jean-Paul Delahaye's home page

French mathematicians
French logicians
French computer scientists
Recreational mathematicians
Mathematics popularizers
Combinatorial game theorists
University of Paris alumni
1952 births
Living people
Lille University of Science and Technology alumni
French male non-fiction writers